Shayne Brodie (born 30 May 1973) is a Fijian sailor. He competed in the Tornado event at the 1996 Summer Olympics.

References

External links
 

1973 births
Living people
Fijian male sailors (sport)
Olympic sailors of Fiji
Sailors at the 1996 Summer Olympics – Tornado
Place of birth missing (living people)